"Nothing at All" was released in the United States only in March 2003, as the second single from Santana's Shaman album. It was written by Matchbox Twenty's Rob Thomas along with Cory Rooney. The song features Musiq Soulchild singing in the vocals.  "Nothing at All" was produced by Rooney and Dan Shea. Directed by Marc Webb with the  Female lead played by Joy Bryant and the male lead played by  actor Andre Warmsley.

Santana (band) songs
Musiq Soulchild songs
2003 singles
Songs written by Cory Rooney
Songs written by Rob Thomas (musician)